Kristian Donaldson  sometimes simply credited as Kristian, is a comic book artist based in Dallas, Texas.

Early life
Donaldson attended the Savannah College of Art and Design.

Career
Donaldson has been working in comics since 2004. Notable works include "Supermarket" from IDW, and "99 Days" from Vertigo. He is currently working on "The Massive" with writer Brian Wood, for Dark Horse.

Donaldson has done covers for comic book adaptations and tie-ins to Chuck and Dr. Horrible, and "The Guild".

Bibliography
99 Days 2011. pencils, inks, colors. Vertigo Crime line.
Supermarket 2006 miniseries
DMZ #11, #20, #35, #36. 2006 - 2008. DC/Vertigo Comics
The Guild 2011 Dark Horse Comics
Myspace Dark Horse Presents v.4. 2009. cover. Dark Horse Comics
Dr. Horrible - 2009. covers for mini series. Dark Horse Comics
Forsaken 2004 miniseries. Image Comics
Doomed 2005 anthology piece. IDW Publishing
Amazing Fantasy #15 2005 Marvel Comics
Fallen Angel #15 and #16. IDW Publishing
Two Guns 2007. miniseries. covers. BOOM! Studios
Unthinkable #1 2009. cover. BOOM! Studios
Chuck 2008. 6-issue miniseries. covers. DC/Wildstorm
The Goon 2009. anthology piece in Myspace Dark Horse presents v.4.
PVP: Awesomeology collaborative cover illustration/slipcase design with series creator Scott Kurtz. Image Comics

External links

Official website of Kristian Donaldson

Living people
American comics artists
Year of birth missing (living people)